Murilo Cerqueira Paim  (born 27 March 1997) is a Brazilian professional footballer who plays as a central defender or defensive midfielder for Brazilian club Palmeiras.

Club career

Cruzeiro
Cerqueira played for the Cruzeiro Youth Teams since 2012. In 2017, he was promoted to the senior team. On March 21, 2017 he made his professional debut for Cruzeiro in the match against Joinville Esporte Clube at the Primeira Liga.

Lokomotiv
On 18 June 2019, he signed a 5-year contract with the Russian Premier League club FC Lokomotiv Moscow. On 12 May 2021, he scored the last goal in a 3–1 victory over PFC Krylia Sovetov Samara in the 2020–21 Russian Cup final.

Palmeiras
On 12 January 2022, Cerqueira signed a five-season contract with Série A club Palmeiras.

International career
Cerqueira represented Brazil U20 at youth level. He was one of the sparring players for the Brazil 2016 Olympic team. He was also part of the Brazil U-23 team which won the 2019 Toulon Tournament. He was present for the 2020 Summer Olympics qualifying cycle, but ended up not being called up to the final list for the tournament.

Career statistics

Club

Honours

Club
Cruzeiro
 Copa do Brasil: 2017, 2018
 Campeonato Mineiro: 2018, 2019

Lokomotiv Moscow
 Russian Cup: 2020–21
 Russian Super Cup: 2019 

Palmeiras
 Recopa Sudamericana: 2022
 Campeonato Paulista: 2022
 Campeonato Brasileiro Série A: 2022

International
Brazil U23
 Toulon Tournament: 2019

Individual
Bola de Prata: 2022
Campeonato Brasileiro Série A Team of the Year: 2022

References

External links
Cruzeiro profile 

1997 births
Sportspeople from Bahia
Living people
Brazilian footballers
Brazil under-20 international footballers
Association football defenders
Cruzeiro Esporte Clube players
FC Lokomotiv Moscow players
Sociedade Esportiva Palmeiras players
Campeonato Brasileiro Série A players
Brazilian expatriate footballers
Expatriate footballers in Russia
Russian Premier League players